In graph theory, the metric dimension of a graph G is the minimum cardinality of a subset S of vertices such that all other vertices are uniquely determined by their distances to the vertices in S. Finding the metric dimension of a graph is an NP-hard problem; the decision version, determining whether the metric dimension is less than a given value, is NP-complete.

Detailed definition
For an ordered subset  of vertices and a vertex v in a connected graph G, the representation of v with respect to W is the ordered k-tuple , where d(x,y) represents the distance between the vertices x and y. The set W is a resolving set (or locating set) for G if every two vertices of G have distinct representations. Graphs are special examples of metric spaces with their intrinsic path metric.

Trees
If a tree is a path, its metric dimension is one. Otherwise, let L denote the set of leaves, degree-one vertices in the tree. Let K be the set of vertices that have degree greater than two, and that are connected by paths of degree-two vertices to one or more leaves. Then the metric dimension is |L| − |K|. A basis of this cardinality may be formed by removing from L one of the leaves associated with each vertex in K. The same algorithm is valid for the line graph of the tree, and thus any tree and its line graph have the same metric dimension.

Properties
In , it is proved that:
 The metric dimension of a graph  is 1 if and only if  is a path.
 The metric dimension of an -vertex graph is  if and only if it is a complete graph.

Relations between the order, the metric dimension and the diameter
 prove the inequality  for any -vertex graph with diameter  and metric dimension .

For specific graph classes, smaller bounds can hold. For example,  proved that  for trees (the bound being tight for even values of ), and a bound of the form  for outerplanar graphs. The same authors proved that  for graphs with no complete graph of order  as a minor and also gave bounds for chordal graphs and graphs of bounded treewidth. The authors 
 proved bounds of the form  for interval graphs and permutation graphs, and bounds of the form  for unit interval graphs, bipartite permutation graphs and cographs.

Computational complexity

Decision complexity
Deciding whether the metric dimension of a graph is at most a given integer is NP-complete. It remains NP-complete for bounded-degree planar graphs, split graphs, bipartite graphs and their complements, line graphs of bipartite graphs, unit disk graphs, interval graphs of diameter 2 and permutation graphs of diameter 2, and graphs of bounded treewidth.

For any fixed constant k, the graphs of metric dimension at most k can be recognized in polynomial time, by testing all possible k-tuples of vertices, but this algorithm is not fixed-parameter tractable (for the natural parameter k, the solution size). Nevertheless, the problem becomes fixed-parameter tractable when restricted to interval graphs, and more generally to graphs of bounded tree-length, such as chordal graphs, permutation graphs or asteroidal-triple-free graphs.

Deciding whether the metric dimension of a tree is at most a given integer can be done in linear time Other linear-time algorithms exist for cographs, chain graphs, and cactus block graphs (a class including both cactus graphs and block graphs). The problem may be solved in polynomial time on outerplanar graphs. It may also be solved in polynomial time for graphs of bounded cyclomatic number, but this algorithm is again not fixed-parameter tractable (for the parameter "cyclomatic number") because the exponent in the polynomial depends on the cyclomatic number. There exist fixed-parameter tractable algorithms to solve the metric dimension problem for the parameters "vertex cover", "max leaf number", and "modular width". Graphs with bounded cyclomatic number, vertex cover number or max leaf number all have bounded treewidth, however it is an open problem to determine the complexity of the metric dimension problem even on graphs of treewidth 2, that is, series–parallel graphs.

Approximation complexity
In the set cover problem formed from a metric dimension problem, the elements to be covered are the  pairs of vertices to be distinguished, and the sets that can cover them are the sets of pairs that can be distinguished by a single chosen vertex. The approximation bound then follows by applying standard approximation algorithms for set cover. An alternative greedy algorithm that chooses vertices according to the difference in entropy between the equivalence classes of distance vectors before and after the choice achieves an even better approximation ratio, . This approximation ratio is close to best possible, as under standard complexity-theoretic assumptions a ratio of  cannot be achieved in polynomial time for any . The latter hardness of approximation still holds for instances restricted to subcubic graphs, and even to bipartite subcubic graphs.

References

Notes

Bibliography

.
. 
.
.
.
.
.
.
.
.

.
 A1.5: GT61, p. 204.
.
.
.
.
.

.
.

.
.
.

Graph invariants